The 2004–05 Israeli Women's Cup (Gvia HaMedina Nashim) was the 7th season of Israel's women's nationwide football cup competition.

The competition was won, for the third consecutive time, by Maccabi Holon, who had beaten ASA Tel Aviv University 2–1 in the final.

Results

First round

Quarter-finals
Matches were played on 9 May 2005.

Semi-finals

Final

References

External links
Women's State Cup 2005 Women's Football in Israel 
Women's State Cup 2004-05 Eran R, 18 November 2015, Israblog.co.il 

Israel Women's Cup seasons
Cup
Israel